Since the first election following the 2007 municipal reform, Jørgen Gaarde from the Social Democrats had been mayor of Skanderborg Municipality. This was until 2019 when he announced he was resigning and that Frands Fischer would take over. 

In this election, the Social Democrats suffered the highest decrease in total vote share, and lost a seat. However the traditional red bloc won 16 seats, and eventually it was announced that Frands Fischer would continue as mayor.

Electoral system
For elections to Danish municipalities, a number varying from 9 to 31 are chosen to be elected to the municipal council. The seats are then allocated using the D'Hondt method and a closed list proportional representation.
Skanderborg Municipality had 29 seats in 2021

Unlike in Danish General Elections, in elections to municipal councils, electoral alliances are allowed.

Electoral alliances  

Electoral Alliance 1

Electoral Alliance 2

Electoral Alliance 3

Electoral Alliance 4

Results

Notes

References 

Skanderborg